KRUM-LD, virtual channel 24 (UHF digital channel 32.3), is a low-powered Spanish religious independent television station licensed to Renton, Washington, United States. The station is in Seattle, Washington, and its service area does not include its former Community of License of Olympia. This is one of two stations that use virtual channel 24 in the area, overlapping with KBCB-TV in Poulsbo. Previously, the station was a repeater of the programming from the Trinity Broadcasting Network via satellite.

Digital channels
The station's digital signal is multiplexed:

References

External links

RUM-LD
Independent television stations in the United States
Low-power television stations in the United States
Television channels and stations established in 1985
1985 establishments in Washington (state)